The mud snake (Farancia abacura) is a species of nonvenomous, semiaquatic, colubrid snake endemic to the southeastern United States.

Description
The mud snake usually grows to a total length (including tail) of 40 to 54 inches (1-1.4 m), with the record total length being slightly over 80 inches (2 m).

This species is sexually dimorphic in size. Female adults are larger than males in total length.

The upperside of the mud snake is glossy black. The underside is red and black, and the red extends up the sides to form bars of reddish-pink. Although, some have a completely black body with slightly lighter black spots instead of the common reddish colors.

The heavy body is cylindrical in cross section, and the short tail has a terminal spine.

The head scalation is distinctive in that there is only one internasal scale, no preocular scale, and one anterior temporal scale. The dorsal scales are smooth, and are arranged in 19 rows at midbody. There are 168–208 ventral scales and 31–55 subcaudal scales. The anal plate is divided.

Habitat
F. abacura inhabits the edges of streams and cypress swamps, among dense vegetation or under ground debris, using wet conditions to burrow itself into the mud. It is almost fully aquatic and rarely leaves the water, except to lay eggs, hibernate, or during drought to escape drying wetlands. It occupies aquatic habitats with freshwater or brackish waters.  For hibernation, they commonly use cavities in soil or old tree stumps.

Behavior
The mud snake is mostly aquatic and nocturnal. It preys mostly on giant aquatic salamanders in the genera Siren and Amphiuma, but it also eats other amphibians. They are known to use their sharply pointed tails to prod prey items, leading to the nickname "stinging snake", although their tail is not a stinger and cannot sting. Enlarged teeth occur at the rear of the upper jaw, which presumably help to hold slippery prey. Upon being disturbed, mud snakes will sometimes tuck their head beneath their coils and expose the red underside on the tail as a warning display.

Reproduction
Breeding of F. abacura takes place in the spring, mostly in the months of April and May. During copulation, the female will wind itself around the male. They can stay in this position for over a day. Eight weeks after mating, the female lays 4 to 111 eggs in a nest dug out of moist soil, sometimes in alligator nests.  The nests of this species can commonly be found in the ground under debris, but it is not limited to those areas. These nests are cavities in sandy soil with the eggs laid within. Some eggs can even be embedded into the wall. There is a positive correlation between body length and clutch size, with larger females having larger clutch sizes. She will remain with her eggs until they hatch, in the fall, usually September or October. Although unhatched eggs have not been found in the winter or spring, many juvenile mudsnakes are captured entering wetlands in the spring, most likely from clutches deposited and hatched in the preceding late summer or autumn. It is thought that mudsnake hatchlings either enter aquatic habitats in the autumn or delay entering them until the spring, but it is not known if they remain in a terrestrial nest or disperse into terrestrial habitats during this time.

Geographic range
The mud snake is found in the southeastern United States, in the states of Alabama, Arkansas, Florida, Georgia, Illinois, Kentucky, Louisiana, Mississippi, Missouri, North Carolina, Oklahoma, South Carolina, Tennessee, Texas, and Virginia.

Cultural significance
The mud snake is one of a few animals which may be the origin of the hoop snake myth. J.D. Willson writes:

The hoop snake myth has also been attributed to the coachwhip snake.

Subspecies
There are two recognized subspecies of Farancia abacura, including the nominotypical subspecies:

Farancia abacura abacura (Holbrook, 1836) – eastern mud snake
Farancia abacura reinwardtii (Schlegel, 1837) – western mud snake

References

External links

Illinois Natural History Survey: Farancia abacura
"Black Snakes": Identification and Ecology – University of Florida fact sheet

Further reading
Behler JL, King FW (1979). The Audubon Society Field Guide to North American Reptiles and Amphibians. New York: Alfred A. Knopf. 743 pp., 657 color plates. . (Farancia abacura, pp. 609–610 + Plate 492).
Conant R (1975). A Field Guide to Reptiles and Amphibians of Eastern and Central North America, Second Edition. Boston: Houghton Mifflin. xviii + 429 pp.  (hardcover),  (paperback). (Farancia abacura, pp. 176–177 + Plate 25 + Map 138).
Conant R, Bridges W (1939). What Snake Is That?: A Field Guide to the Snakes of the United States East of the Rocky Mountains. (With 108 drawings by Edmond Malnate). New York and London: D. Appleton-Century. Frontispiece map + viii + 163 pp. + Plates A-C, 1–32. (Farancia abacura, pp. 33–36 + Plate 3, Figure 7).

Holbrook JE (1836). North American Herpetology; or, A Description of the Reptiles Inhabiting the United States. Vol. I. Philadelphia: J. Dobson. 120 pp. (Coluber abacurus, new species, pp. 119–120).

Morris PA (1948). Boy's Book of Snakes: How to Recognize and Understand Them.  A volume of the Humanizing Science Series, edited by Jacques Cattell. New York: Ronald Press. New York. viii + 185 pp. ("The Mud Snake", Farancia abacura, pp. 87–88, 179).
Powell R, Conant R, Collins JT (2016). Peterson Field Guide to Reptiles and Amphibians of Eastern and Central North America, Fourth Edition. Boston and New York: Houghton Mifflin Harcourt. xiv + 494 pp., 47 plates, 207 figures. (Farancia abacura, pp. i, 405–406 + Plate 39).
Schlegel H (1837). Essai sur la physionomie des serpens. Amsterdam: M.H. Schonekat. Amsterdam. Partie Générale. xxviii + 251 pp. (Homalopsis reinwardtii, new species, p. 173). AND Partie Descriptive. 606 + xvi pp. (Homalopsis reinwardtii, pp. 357–358). (in French).
Schmidt KP, Davis DD (1941). Field Book of Snakes of the United States and Canada. New York: G.P. Putnam's Sons. 365 pp. (Farancia abacura, pp. 106–108, Figure 22 + Plate 9).
Wright AH, Wright AA (1957). Handbook of Snakes of the United States and Canada. Itahaca and London: Comstock. 1,105 pp. (in 2 volumes) (Farancia abacura, pp. 271–280, Figures 84–85, Map 25).
Zim HS, Smith HM (1956). Reptiles and Amphibians: A Guide to Familiar American Species: A Golden Nature Guide. New York: Simon and Schuster. 160 pp. (Farancia abacura, pp. 75, 156).

Farancia
Reptiles of the United States
Fauna of the Southeastern United States
Reptiles described in 1836
Semiaquatic animals
Taxa named by John Edwards Holbrook